Smith School of Business (formerly Queen's School of Business) is a business school affiliated with Queen's University at Kingston. It is located at the university's Goodes Hall. Since July 2021, the school's dean has been Wanda Costen.

The School awards Bachelor of Commerce (BCom), Master of Business Administration (MBA), Executive MBA (EMBA), Accelerated MBA (AMBA), Master of Science in Management, (MSc) Master of Finance (MFin), Master of International Business (MIB), Master of Management Innovation and Entrepreneurship (MMIE), Master of Management in Artificial Intelligence (MMAI), Master of Management Analytics (MMA), and Ph.D. in Management degrees, as well as graduate diplomas in business (GDB)and accounting (GDA). The School also offers the Smith-Peking Double Degree in partnership with the Guanghua School of Management at Peking University and the Executive MBA Americas in partnership with the Samuel Curtis Johnson Graduate School of Management at Cornell University.

Smith School of Business is fully accredited by the AACSB (United States) and the EFMD (EQUIS) (Europe).

Naming 

On October 1, 2015, the Queen's School of Business was renamed the Stephen J.R. Smith School of Business in recognition of a $50-million donation from Stephen J. R. Smith, a graduate of the Queen's University's Faculty of Engineering and Applied Science. The donation is the largest gift ever made to a Canadian business school, growing the school's endowment from $54 million to $104 million.  As of 2015, this will result in Smith being a close second in total endowment among Canadian business schools, next to only the Rotman School of Management.

History 
Queen's University launched its undergraduate business program in 1919, making it the oldest Bachelor of Commerce in Canada. The first woman to earn an undergraduate business degree, Beatrice Eakins, graduated from the program in 1922 alongside six other students. The MBA program was launched in 1960. Queen's School of Business became its own faculty in 1963, with Lawrence MacPherson as the first dean. The school was accredited by the AACSB in 1998, and it was the first program in Ontario to be accredited by the AACSB.

Location

The majority of business classes are held in Goodes Hall. Opened in 2002, the building is named in honour of the family of Melvin Goodes, a Commerce ‘57 alumnus and former Chairman and CEO of Warner–Lambert. In September 2012, a significant expansion of Goodes Hall was completed, increasing the size of the building by 75,000 ft² to a total of 188,000 ft². The expansion included new classrooms, breakout rooms, and 51 additional faculty offices.

The Smith School of Business opened its first foreign campus in Dubai, United Arab Emirates, at the DIFC on May 25, 2007. Classes started in October 2007. The campus mainly hosts Queen's executive development programs.

Reputation and rankings

The Smith School of Business ranked 1st nationally and 38th globally in highest number of graduates employed as Chief Executive Officers or equivalent in a Fortune Global 500 corporation. The MBA Class of 2019 had the highest total starting pay of any Canadian MBA program.

Bloomberg Businessweek:

2019-20 Best Business Schools Rankings 2nd in Canada

Financial Times:

2017 Executive Education - Customized Ranking 1st in North America, 2nd worldwide

2017 Masters in Management Ranking 1st in North America

2016 Global MBA Ranking 1st in Canada for Alumni Recommendation

2016 Global MBA Ranking 1st in Canada for Salary Increase

2016 Global MBA Ranking 1st in Canada for Value for Money

2016 Global EMBA Ranking Cornell University: Johnson/Queen's Smith School of Business 47th worldwide

Canadian MBA Alliance 
The school is also a founding member of the Canadian MBA Alliance which was created in 2013. All six members of the alliance rank among the world’s top 100 schools, according to their participation in key rankings – Financial Times, Business Week, and The Economist.

Research 
During the 2018–2019 academic year, Smith faculty published 44 articles in academic journals, 14 of which were ranked in the Financial Times’ 50 top-tier journals.

Notable alumni

Undergraduate

Bachelor of Commerce 

 Chris Viehbacher, former CEO, Sanofi, former Chairman, Genzyme
 Douglas Peters, former Chief Economist, Toronto-Dominion Bank, former Secretary of State, Government of Canada
 Earle McLaughlin, former president, Royal Bank of Canada
 Gordon Nixon, former CEO, Royal Bank of Canada
 John Stackhouse, Senior Vice President, Office of the CEO, Royal Bank of Canada, former Editor-in-Chief, The Globe and Mail
 Kimbal Musk, co-founder, Zip2, Big Green
 Melvin Goodes, former CEO, Warner-Lambert
Neil Pasricha, best-selling author and public speaker

Graduate

MBA 
Andrew Lue, defensive back, Canadian Football League
Christine Robinson, Canadian Olympic water polo player
David Radler, former president, Ravelston Corporation
Gabriel Beauchesne-Sévigny, Canadian Olympic sprint canoeist
Greg Douglas, Canadian Olympic sailor
Lee Parkhill, Canadian Olympic sailor
Maryann Turcke, COO, National Football League, former president, Bell Media
Megan Lukan, Canadian Olympic rugby sevens player
Michele Romanow, co-founder and President, Clearbanc, Dragon, Dragon's Den
Nik Nanos, founder, Nanos Research

Executive MBA 
Benoît Huot, Canadian Paralympic swimmer
Jeremiah Brown, Canadian Olympic rower
Kelly McCrimmon, GM, Vegas Golden Knights, owner, Brandon Wheat Kings

MMIE 

 Martha McCabe, Canadian Olympic swimmer

References

External links
 Smith School of Business Website

School of Business
Business schools in Canada
Educational institutions established in 1919
1919 establishments in Ontario
Accounting schools in Canada